Conjuration is the fourth EP by Polish extreme metal band Behemoth. The first three tracks were recorded between June and September 2002. The live songs were recorded at the Mystic Festival on 13 October 2001. The tracks were then mastered at the High End Studio in June 2003.

In 2011, the EP (along with several previously unreleased live tracks) was bundled with Slaves Shall Serve and released as part of the compilation album Abyssus Abyssum Invocat.

Track listing

Personnel

Release history

References 

Behemoth (band) EPs
2003 EPs
Regain Records EPs
Albums produced by Adam Darski